Jorge Padilla may refer to:

Jorge Padilla (baseball) (born 1979), Puerto Rican baseball player
Jorge Padilla (footballer, born 1993), Mexican football defender
Jorge Padilla (footballer, born 2001), Spanish football forward